This list is intended to contain all significant canals and aqueducts in the Commonwealth of Massachusetts, USA. It includes both vanished waterways and those that still exist.

 Blackstone Canal, Grafton
 Broad Canal, Cambridge
 Broad Brook Canal, Ludlow
 Cape Cod Canal, Sagamore
 First Level Canal, Holyoke
 Fort Point Channel, Boston
 Hampshire and Hampden Canal, Hampshire and Hampden Counties
 Hecla Canal, Blackstone
 Lechmere Canal, Cambridge
 Lowell canals
 Eastern Canal
 Hamilton Canal
 Lawrence Wasteway
 Massachusetts Wasteway
 Merrimack Canal
 Merrimack Wasteway
 Northern Canal
 Pawtucket Canal
 Western Canal
 Long Pond Canal, Lakeville
 Madaket Ditch, Nantucket
 Mattakeset Herring Creek, Edgartown
 Middlesex Canal, Middlesex County
 Mill River Diversion, Easthampton
 Mother Brook, Dedham
 North Canal, Lawrence
 Northfield Mountain Tailrace Tunnel, Millers Falls
 Salem Beverly Waterway Canal, Beverly
 Second Level Canal, Holyoke
 South Hadley Canal, South Hadley
 Third Level Canal, Holyoke
 Turners Falls Canal, Turners Falls

Massachusetts
Canals
Canals
Canals